E-64 is an epoxide which can irreversibly inhibit a wide range of cysteine peptidases.

The compound was first isolated and identified from Aspergillus japonicus in 1978.  It has since been shown to inhibit many cysteine peptidases such as papain, cathepsin B, cathepsin L, calpain and staphopain.

The low toxic effects of the inhibitor, in addition to its effective mechanism of action, makes E-64 a potential template for drugs to treat diseases where high levels of a cysteine proteases are the primary cause.

Structure and mechanism of inhibition

E-64 possesses a trans-epoxysuccinic acid group coupled to a modified dipeptide. The covalent attachment of E-64  to the active site cysteine occurs via nucleophillic attack from the thiol group of the cysteine on C2 of the epoxide. Early studies suggested that the amino-4-guanidinobutane bound in the S3' subsite and the leucyl group in the S2' subsite, however published crystal structures of E-64 complexed with papain indicated that E-64 binds via the S subsites.

See also
 Aloxistatin

References

Epoxides
Guanidines
Protease inhibitors
Carboxylic acids
Carboxamides
Dipeptides